Thomas J. Farrell is an American medievalist. A professor of English and head of the English department at Stetson University, Florida, he specializes in Geoffrey Chaucer. Farrell, holder of a Ph.D. from the University of Michigan, is a contributing editor for the Sources & Analogues of the Canterbury Tales (2002) and editor of Bakhtin and Medieval Voices (1996).

References

External links

Living people
American medievalists
Stetson University faculty
University of Michigan alumni
Year of birth missing (living people)